is the sixth studio album by the Japanese girl band Princess Princess, released on December 7, 1991, by Sony Records. It includes the singles "Seven Years After" and "Jungle Princess". "Joker to 100-ri no Mōja" features lead guitarist Kanako Nakayama on vocals.

The album stayed No. 1 on Oricon's albums chart for three consecutive weeks, making it the band's third of five consecutive No. 1 albums. It was also certified as Double Platinum by the RIAJ.

Track listing 
All music is composed by Kaori Okui, except where indicated; all music is arranged by Princess Princess.

Charts

Certification

References

External links
 
 
 

Princess Princess (band) albums
1991 albums
Sony Music Entertainment Japan albums
Japanese-language albums